The Red Sea Film Festival Foundation is a non-profit cultural organization registered in Saudi Arabia. The foundation is chaired by Prince Badr Al Saud, Saudi Arabia's minister of culture, the president of the foundation is the Saudi director and producer Mahmoud Sabbagh.

Responsibilities
The main responsibility of the foundation is organizing the Red Sea International Film Festival, an annual film festival launched in 2019 and held in Jeddah, western Saudi Arabia, starting from 2020. The 2021 film festival will be held Dec 6–15. The foundation is also in charge of supporting the local film industry and national storytellers by providing education and grants.

Red Sea Lodge
The foundation has introduced Red Sea Lodge intending to provide supports for filmmakers through training and mentorship. In collaboration with TorinoFilmLab, the Lodge will select some filmmakers and provide them training and development through all stages of filmmaking. The outcomes of the training and development processes will then be presented during the Red Sea International Film Festival. The winning work will be awarded a $500,000 prize.

References



2018 establishments in Saudi Arabia
Arts organizations established in 2018
Arts organisations based in Saudi Arabia
Non-profit organisations based in Saudi Arabia
Film festivals in Saudi Arabia